The 2022–23 season is the 136th season in the existence of Cheltenham Town Football Club and the club's second consecutive season in League One. In addition to the league, they will also compete in the 2022–23 FA Cup, the 2022–23 EFL Cup and the 2022–23 EFL Trophy.

Transfers

In

Out

Loans in

Loans out

Pre-season and friendlies
On 16 May 2022, National League South side Bath City announced that a pre-season fixture at home to Cheltenham had been scheduled for 9 July. Cheltenham Town then confirmed their first set of pre-season fixtures on June 3. A second home friendly fixture, against Birmingham City was added. On June 16, a home fixture against Northampton Town was added to the pre-season schedule.

Competitions

Overall record

League One

League table

Results summary

Results by round

Matches

On 23 June, the league fixtures were announced.

FA Cup

The Robins were drawn at home to Alvechurch in the first round.

EFL Cup

EFL Trophy

On 20 June, the initial Group stage draw was made, grouping Cheltenham Town with Milton Keynes Dons and Walsall.

References

Cheltenham Town
Cheltenham Town F.C. seasons
English football clubs 2022–23 season